Lewis David Stevens (13 April 1936 – 15 January 2023) was a British Conservative Party politician.

Stevens was educated at Oldbury Grammar School, the University of Liverpool, and Lanchester College, Coventry. He carried out national service with the Royal Air Force, and then worked in the motor industry as an engineer.

He was a member of Nuneaton Borough Council from 1966 to 1972.

On his second attempt, Stevens was elected Member of Parliament for the marginal seat of Nuneaton in 1983, after the Labour incumbent Les Huckfield stood down to seek another seat. His election was aided by recent boundary changes, and a substantial swing of Labour voters to the SDP. He served until his defeat by Labour's Bill Olner at the 1992 general election.

In Parliament, he was on the right wing of the party, supporting capital punishment, but did rebel on proposals to limit student grants. He served as a PPS to Colin Moynihan 1989-92 and David Heathcoat-Amory 1990-92.

After leaving Parliament, he returned to work as a management and industrial consultant. 

Subsequently, he served as President of the Nuneaton Conservative Association.

Stevens died in January 2023, at the age of 86.

References

External links 

1936 births
2023 deaths
Conservative Party (UK) MPs for English constituencies
UK MPs 1983–1987
UK MPs 1987–1992